The Hutchinson News is a daily newspaper serving the city of Hutchinson, Kansas, United States.  The publication was awarded the 1965 Pulitzer Prize for Public Service "for its courageous and constructive campaign, culminating in 1964, to bring about more equitable reapportionment of the Kansas Legislature, despite powerful opposition in its own community."

History
The Hutchinson News began July 4, 1872, when Houston Whiteside, a young Tennessee lawyer, published the first paper. The modern Hutchinson News dates to October 10, 1895, when W.Y. Morgan purchased The News after turning over the Emporia Gazette to William Allen White. By 1920, The News had a circulation of nearly 12,000 and was in a daily battle with The Hutchinson Gazette.

In 1924, Morgan purchased the Gazette and renamed it the Herald. He published two papers, The Herald in the morning and The News at night, with separate staffs working in the same plant. When Morgan died in 1932, his wife took over the papers. A year later she sold the papers to Hutchinson Publishing Co., principal members of which were John P. and Sidney Harris. John P. Harris became publisher and circulation grew to 50,000. A Sunday paper was started in 1937 and the two papers were consolidated into The Hutchinson News-Herald in 1942. The Harrises acquired more newspapers, mostly in Kansas, and the company became known as Harris Enterprises, which ultimately included the Garden City Telegram, Hays Daily News, Ottawa Herald, The Salina Journal, and The Hawk Eye of Burlington, Iowa, as well as MarketAide, an advertising and marketing firm in Salina, and Harris Business Services, a shared services company.

The newspaper moved to its current headquarters in 1957 and dropped "Herald" from the name. In 1965, The News won journalism’s most coveted award, the Pulitzer Prize for meritorious service, for its four-year editorial and court battle for reapportionment in Kansas. In August 1988, The News converted to an all-morning publication. The News employed approximately 120 full- and part-time employees. Hutchinson Publishing Co. grew to operate not just The Hutchinson News but also The Bee, a shopper publication, and LogicMaze, an Internet services company. Employees, through an employee stock ownership plan, owned a portion of Harris Enterprises.

In November 2016, GateHouse Media announced it was purchasing The News and the other Harris newspapers.

Editors and Publishers
 1872 Houston Whiteside, L.J. Perry
 1875 Fletcher Meredith
 1889 Ralph Easley
 1891 Marion Watson
 1895 A.L. Sponsler
 1895 W.Y. Morgan
 1932 Mrs. W.Y. Morgan
 1933 John P. Harris
 1962 Peter Macdonald
 1963 Peter Macdonald, John McCormally
 1965 Stuart Awbrey
 1979 Richard Buzbee
 1993 Wayne Lee
 1996 Bruce Buchanan
 1997 Jim Bloom
 2006 John D. Montgomery
 2016 Ron Sylvester (editor)
 2018 Steve Lundblade (publisher)
 2018 Cheyenne Derksen

See also
 List of newspapers in Kansas

References

External links

The Hutchinson News official website

Newspapers published in Kansas
Pulitzer Prize-winning newspapers
Publications established in 1872
1872 establishments in Kansas
Pulitzer Prize for Public Service winners